
Year 313 (CCCXIII) was a common year starting on Thursday (link will display the full calendar) of the Julian calendar. At the time, it was known as the Year of the Consulship of Constantinus and Licinianus (or, less frequently, year 1066 Ab urbe condita). The denomination 313 for this year has been used since the early medieval period, when the Anno Domini calendar era became the prevalent method in Europe for naming years. This year is notable for ending of the persecution of Christians in the Roman Empire.

Events 
 By place 

 Roman Empire 
 At the end of 312 or in early 313, the retired Emperor Diocletian dies in his palace in Split, most likely from natural causes.
 February: Emperors Constantine I and Licinius convene in Mediolanum (modern Milan). Licinius marries Constantine's half-sister Constantia, and they issue the Edict of Milan. This edict ends the Great Persecution against the Christians and is the first piece of legislation in western history to decree freedom of religion. It also returns property confiscated from Christians. The edict is posted in Nicomedia on June 13.
 Emperor Maximinus Daza crosses the Bosphorus with an army of 70,000 men and lays siege to Heraclea in Thrace. He captures the city after eight days.
 Battle of Tzirallum: Licinius defeats his rival Maximinus in Thrace, who then flees to Cilicia. After losing the Cilician Gates to Licinius' forces, Maximinus commits suicide.
 Licinius conducts a purge of the wider Tetrarchic dynasty. He executes Galerius' son Candidianus, Valerius Severus' son Severianus (whom he accuses of conspiracy), and Maximinus' wife, son and daughter. Diocletian's wife Prisca and daughter Galeria Valeria go into hiding.

 Asia 
 March 14 – Emperor Huai of Jin is executed by Liu Cong, ruler of the Xiongnu state (Han Zhao). At the imperial new year he and a number of former Jin officials are poisoned. Crown prince Min of Jin, age 13, succeeds, in Chang'an, his uncle Huai of Jin and becomes the new emperor of the Jin Dynasty.
 Nintoku, the fourth son of Ōjin, becomes the 16th emperor of Japan.

 By topic 

 Art and Science 
 Basilica of Maxentius and Constantine (or Basilica Nova), in Rome, is finished.

 Religion 
 February 3 – Edict of Milan: Constantine the Great and co-emperor Licinius meet at a conference in Mediolanum (modern Milan). They proclaim a policy of religious freedom for all, ending the persecution of Christians in the Roman Empire and returning property confiscated from Christians. The edict is posted in Nicomedia on June 13.
 October 2 – Lateran Synod: Donatism is declared a heresy.
 Arius preaches of the human nature of Jesus.

Births 
 Cyril of Jerusalem, Christian bishop and theologian (d. 386)
 Didymus the Blind, Alexandrian theologian (d. 398)
 Shi Hong, Chinese emperor of the Jie state (d. 334)

Deaths 
 March 14 – Huai of Jin, Chinese emperor (b. 284)
 Achillas (the Great), pope and patriarch of Alexandria
 Galerius Valerius Maximinus, Roman emperor (b. 270)
 Candidianus (son of Galerius)
 Severianus, son of Valerius Severus
 Guangxian, Chinese empress of the Xiongnu state
 Zhang Huiguang (or Wuxiao), Chinese empress

References